Lady Down Quarry is a 2,300 square metre geological Site of Special Scientific Interest in the northeast of Tisbury parish in Wiltshire, England, notified in 1990.

Sources

 Natural England citation sheet for the site (accessed 7 April 2022)

External links
 Natural England website (SSSI information)

Sites of Special Scientific Interest in Wiltshire
Sites of Special Scientific Interest notified in 1990
Quarries in Wiltshire